In Greek mythology, Torrhebia (Ancient Greek: Τορρηβίας) was mother of Carius by Zeus. Her name was connected to Torrhebos, name of a city in Lydia.

Note

References 

 Stephanus of Byzantium, Stephani Byzantii Ethnicorum quae supersunt, edited by August Meineike (1790-1870), published 1849. A few entries from this important ancient handbook of place names have been translated by Brady Kiesling. Online version at the Topos Text Project.

Mortal women of Zeus
Women in Greek mythology